Cearbhall Óg Ó Dálaigh (fl. 1630), sometimes spelt in English as Carroll Oge O'Daly, was a 17th-century Irish language poet and harpist, who composed the song "".

Cearbhall (Carroll) was a common name amongst people of the Ó Dálaigh (O'Daly, Daly) surname, and more than one poet of that surname bore the name. The Cearbhall Óg who composed "Eileanóir a Rún" was from Pallas, near Gorey in County Wexford. The Eileanóir of the poem was the daughter of Sir Morgan Kavanagh of Clonmullen in County Wexford. In folklore, Cearbhall is presented as a womaniser and trickster similar to the Gobán Saor.

Eileanóir a Rún 
Irish folklore recounts how Eileanóir Chaomhánach (Eleanor Kavanagh) eloped with Cearbhall (Carroll) the day she was about to marry another man. Cearbhall arrived at the wedding to play music at the wedding feast, and fell in love with the bride. He composed the song Eileanoir a Rún to woo the bride.

Other Songs and Poems 
Another song, in the style of the crosántacht, Seachrán Chearbhaill,  is ascribed to Cearbhall Óg. Both, a poem by the Dominican priest Pádraigín Haicéad. addressed to Cearbhall, and Cearbhall's poem in response, survive in a 17th-century manuscript. The story Mac na Míchomhairle (The Son of Poor Council) has been ascribed to him in folklore, but current scholarship casts doubt on this ascription.

Cearbhall Óg Ó Dálaigh in Recordings 
A version of Seachrán Chearbhaill by Joe Éinniu Seosamh Ó hÉanaí is available on a CD with the book Joe Éinniu: Nár fhágha mé Bás Choíche by Liam Mac Con Iomaire (Cló Iarchonnachta 2007); and a later recording of an earlier version of the song on Peadar Ó Ceannabháin's CD, Mo Chuid den tSaol (Cló-Iarchonnachta). There are many commercially available recordings of Eleanór a Rún.

Both songs are recognised as part of the traditional Irish language repertoire of unaccompanied ballads known as 'sean-nós song'.

Cearbhall Óg Ó Dálaigh in Literature 
Cearbhall Óg Ó Dálaigh appears as an historical character in Darach Ó Scolaí's Irish language novel An Cléireach, as a soldier in the Royalist army in 1650 and in the Spanish Netherlands as late as 1662.

References

Bibliography

External links
 The song "Eileanóir na Rún" sung sean nós (un-accompanied)

17th-century Irish people
Irish poets
Irish harpists
Irish folk music
Irish folk musicians
Irish folk harpists
Irish-language poets
Medieval Irish writers
Musicians from County Wexford